Andréetangen is a headland at the eastern side of Tjuvfjorden at Edgeøya, Svalbard. The headland is named after German geographer Karl Andrée. Off the headland are the two islands Zieglerøya and Delitschøya.

References

Headlands of Svalbard
Edgeøya